Christian Barry is an American philosopher and Professor of Philosophy at the Australian National University. He is a co-editor of the Journal of Political Philosophy and a former head of the School of Philosophy in the Research School of the Social Sciences at the ANU. Barry is known for his research on international justice. 
Christian was a program officer at the Carnegie Council for Ethics in International Affairs before joining the ANU and is the Ethics Matters podcast co-presenter.

Books
 Responding to Global Poverty: Harm, Responsibility and Agency, (co-authored with Gerhard Øverland) Cambridge University Press, 2016
 International Trade and Labour Standards: A Proposal for Linkage, (co-authored with Sanjay Reddy) Columbia University Press, 2008
 Ethics for Consumers, Oxford University Press, forthcoming

References

External links
Christian Barry at the ANU

21st-century American philosophers
Analytic philosophers
Political philosophers
Philosophy academics
Living people
Academic staff of the Australian National University
Year of birth missing (living people)
American expatriate academics
Columbia University alumni